Sar Choluskan-e Sofla (also Romanized as Sar Cholūskān-e Soflá) is a village in Zardalan Rural District, Helilan District, Chardavol County, Ilam Province, Iran. At the 2006 census, its population was 34, in 7 families. The village is populated by Kurds.

References 

Populated places in Chardavol County
Kurdish settlements in Ilam Province